The German Musicological Society (abbreviated to GfM) is an academic society of musicologists and institutes active in study, research and teaching in Germany. It has over 1600 members. The association is based in Kassel, Hesse.

History 
The society was founded in 1946, continuing the work of a predecessor institution. It deals with questions of historical musicology, ethnomusicology and systematic musicology. The society also promotes musicological research in dialogue with other disciplines. In addition, it sees itself as an organ for communicating findings from the field of music to the public.

The society publishes the scholarly journal Die Musikforschung by Bärenreiter-Verlag and also collaborates with the publishers Breitkopf & Härtel, Henle, Laaber, Georg Olms, and Schott.

Every year a scientific conference with symposia, lectures and events of the specialist groups is organized; every four years another one is held as the "Internationaler Kongress der Gesellschaft für Musikforschung".

Honorary members

Literature 
 Kurt Gudewill: Zwanzig Jahre Gesellschaft für Musikforschung. in Die Musikforschung 20 (1967), .

References

External links 
  

Cultural organisations based in Germany
Musical groups established in 1946
Organisations based in Kassel
1946 establishments in Germany
German musicologists
Professional associations based in Germany